Wydown/Skinker is a neighborhood in St. Louis, Missouri. Washington University in St. Louis is located just north of this neighborhood.  The neighborhood is bounded by the city limits on the west, Forsyth Boulevard on the north, Forest Park (Skinker Blvd.) on the east and Clayton Avenue on the south. The  Missouri Historical Society Library & Research Center is located in the Wydown/Skinker neighborhood.

Demographics

In 2020 Wydown/Skinker's racial makeup was 73.4% White, 2.9% Black, 18.5% Asian, 4.6% Two or More Races, and 0.3% Some Other Race. 3.7% of the people were of Hispanic or Latino origin.

References

Neighborhoods in St. Louis